KCHG (88.9 FM) is a Christian radio station licensed to serve Cedar City, Utah, United States. The station is currently owned by Calvary Chapel Cedar City.

References

External links
KCHG's official website
Calvary Chapel Cedar City's website

Radio stations established in 2012
Cedar City, Utah
CHG
Calvary Chapel Association
2012 establishments in Utah